Chop is a railway station that is located in a small city of Chop, Zakarpattia Oblast in Ukraine. It is part of the Uzhhorod administration (Lviv Railways).

General description
The station is an important transportation hub and gateway to Ukraine. There are two border checkpoints: Strazh for Slovakia and Druzhba for Hungary. The station serves passengers and freight trains. Among the services provided at the station is only embarkment and disembarkment of passengers for commuter and regional lines.

Locomotive depot
The station also contains a locomotive depot that services locomotives. Currently there are no locomotive units assigned to the depot and all M62, ChME3, and D1 multiple units were transferred either to Mukacheve or Koroleve locomotive depots.

Gallery

External links
 
 Chop railway station

!Previous station!!!!Operator!!!!Next Station

Railway stations in Zakarpattia Oblast
Lviv Railways stations
1872 establishments in Austria-Hungary
Slovakia–Ukraine border crossings
Hungary–Ukraine border crossings
Ferenc Pfaff railway stations
Railway stations in Slovakia opened in the 20th century
Railway stations in Slovakia opened in the 19th century